Wendi Stearman is an American politician and member of the Republican Party  who has served as a member of the Oklahoma House of Representatives from the 11th district from 2020 to 2022. First elected in November 2020, she lost reelection in June 2022 to primary challenger John Kane in the midterm elections.

Early life and education 
Stearman was born in Norman, Oklahoma and raised in Collinsville. She attended Pensacola Christian College.

Oklahoma House of Representatives
She was elected to the Oklahoma House of Representatives in November 2020 and assumed office on January 11, 2021. She also serves as vice chair of the House States' Rights Committee. While in the Oklahoma legislature, Stearman introduced the strictest anti-abortion laws in the nation. She lost her first reelection campaign in 2022 to primary challenger John Kane.

Personal life 
Stearman and her husband have six children.

References 

Living people
People from Norman, Oklahoma
Women state legislators in Oklahoma
Republican Party members of the Oklahoma House of Representatives
21st-century American women politicians
21st-century American politicians
Year of birth missing (living people)